The Civil Conservative Party (CCP) is a political grouping in Kuwait.

References

Political parties in Kuwait